Minnie Renwood was a popular dancer of the 1890s in New York City. Her performance of the serpentine dance became the subject of an important legal ruling regarding dance and
copyright.

Dance career

Renwood performed the serpentine dance during a benefit for Ernest Hutchinson at the 14th Street (Manhattan) Theatre in May 1892. She appeared in violet tights and loosely draped white silk skirts at the informal inaugural opening of the Madison Square Garden roof show, on May 26, 1892. Accompanied by Spanish language students she performed her Spanish, butterfly, and shadow dances. The students played mandolins which created a background of staccato music. The sounds caused the lanterns to bob up and down and electric lamps in hues of red, white, and yellow blinked disapprovingly at one another.

Judicial decision

United States Circuit Court Judge Lancombe ruled against an injunction filed by dancer Loie Fuller to prevent Renwood from performing the serpentine dance on the roof of Madison Square Garden, in June 1892. Fuller had originated the dance, which she contended that she retained the exclusive right to perform because she held its copyright. In denying the injunction Lancombe stated it is essential to such a composition that it should tell the same story. The plot may be simple it may be but narrative, or a representation of a single transaction, but it must repeat or mimic some action, speech, emotion, passion, or character, real or imaginary. When it does, its ideas thus expressed become subject of copyright. He concluded by saying that the serpentine dance was only intended to impress the audience with the concept of a comely woman illustrating the poetry of motion in a singularly graceful fashion, and while such an idea may be pleasing, it can hardly be dramatic. Motion for preliminary injunction denied. A central point of his ruling was Lancombe's statement that the mere mechanical movements by which effects are produced on the stage are not subjects of copyright.

Illness

In August 1897 Renwood underwent a serious operation and was confined to a New York City sanitarium. The columnist believed she would not dance again for some time.

References

American female dancers
American dancers
Year of death missing
Year of birth missing